Tereza Čapková (born 24 July 1987, in Příbram) is a Czech track and field athlete who will compete at the 2012 Summer Olympics. She has competed at the 2011 Summer Universiade and 2012 European Athletics Championships.  She finished 7th in the 1500 m at the 2011 World Junior Championships.

References 

Living people
Czech female middle-distance runners
1987 births
Olympic athletes of the Czech Republic
Athletes (track and field) at the 2012 Summer Olympics
Sportspeople from Příbram
Competitors at the 2011 Summer Universiade
Competitors at the 2013 Summer Universiade